Adrishya is a non-fiction Indian Hindi-language television series that aired on Epic TV. The show is based on real-life stories of Indian spies. The show premiered on 21 November 2014 and aired thirteen episodes.

Show summary
Adrishya is a show based on some of the greatest spies in Indian history. These are stories of the unsung heroes that fought for a cause. Every episode depicts the life of a spy and the dangers that accompanied the job. The show presents all the tales from post and pre- Independence era of India.

Some of the spies covered in the show are Chhatrapati Shivaji Maharaj's chief intelligence officer Bahirji Naik, Kacha – Spy of the Gods, Noor Inayat Khan – descendant of Tipu Sultan and a spy for the British in Paris during World War II, Durgawati Devi – the gutsy lady who helped Bhagat Singh escape, Jeevsiddhi – Chanakya's spy, Spies of R&AW Ravindra Kaushik – the spy who infiltrated Pakistan’s army, Ajit Doval who sabotaged Khalistani terrorists during Operation Black Thunder, Amar Bhushan and many more. The series was consistently rated among the top ten shows of this station.

Production
The show is produced by Nidhi Tuli, Ashraf Abbas and Akash Thakkar of Rangrez Films and written by Amit Babbar, Anurag Goswami, Purva Naresh, Nidhi Tuli, Raaghav Dar and Sneha Nair. It was shot by Alphonse Roy and edited by Navnita Sen and Zubin Sheikh.

Episodes

 Episode 1 - Bahirji Naik - The Chhatrapati Shivaji's Chief Intelligence Officer
 Episode 2 - Noor Inayat Khan - The Unlikely Spy
 Episode 3 - Kacha - Spy of The Gods
 Episode 4 - KSN & Kao
 Episode 5 - Aziz Un Nisa
 Episode 6 - Ravindra Kaushik
 Episode 7 - Durga Bhabhi
 Episode 8 - Ajit Doval
 Episode 9 - Sharan Kaur
 Episode 10 - Jeevsiddhi
 Episode 11 - Chand Bardai
 Episode 12 - Saraswathi Rajamani
 Episode 13 - Amar Bhushan

External links

References

Hindi-language television shows
2014 Indian television series debuts
Indian documentary television series
Epic TV original programming
Indian historical television series
Sikhism in fiction
Indian independence movement fiction
Indian anthology television series
Espionage television series
Television series about intelligence agencies
Non-fiction works about espionage
Research and Analysis Wing
Cultural depictions of spies